Gerard V. Donaghy (20 February 1954 – 30 January 1972), sometimes transcribed as Gerald Donaghey, was a native of the Bogside, Derry who was killed by members of the 1st Battalion, Parachute Regiment on Bloody Sunday in Derry, Northern Ireland.

Early life
Both of Donaghy's parents had died by 1966, when he was 12 years old, and he was raised by his elder siblings, Mary and Patrick. According to Donaghy's older sister, Mary Doherty, Donaghy was a bright scholar but "one of those children who was very bright but who just never used his brains."

In 1969, at the age of 15, he and his siblings moved to Meenan Square, where he lived until his death. In 1970, Donaghy obtained a job in the Waterside with Carlin's Brewery as a delivery hand on a beer lorry. He lost this employment shortly before his seventeenth birthday in 1971 when he was sentenced to six months' imprisonment by the Royal Ulster Constabulary for throwing stones at policemen. Donaghy was imprisoned in June 1971; he was released on 24 December and returned to live with his sister in Meenan Square.

At the time of his death at age 17, Donaghy had been out of prison for just five weeks. He was unemployed and seeking work.

Bloody Sunday

On 30 January 1972, 27 civil rights protesters were shot by members of the 1st Battalion of the British Parachute Regiment during a Northern Ireland Civil Rights Association march in the Bogside area of the city. Fourteen people, six of whom were minors, died in the incident. Donaghy was shot in the stomach while running to safety between Glenfada Park and Abbey Park. A further individual named Gerard McKinney (aged 35) was fatally shot as he attempted to assist Donaghy.

Shortly after he had been shot, Gerard Donaghy was brought to a nearby house by bystanders where he was examined by a doctor. His pockets were turned out in an effort to identify him.

A later Royal Ulster Constabulary photograph of Donaghy's corpse showed nail bombs in his pockets. Neither those who searched his pockets in the house immediately after the shooting nor the British army medical officer (Soldier 138) who pronounced his death shortly afterwards say they saw any bombs. Donaghy had been a member of Fianna Éireann, a youth section of the Provisional IRA, sometimes referred to as the "Junior IRA". Paddy Ward, then a leader of the Fianna and an alleged police informant, and who gave evidence at the Saville Inquiry, claimed that he had given two nail bombs to Donaghy several hours before he was shot dead.

Widgery Tribunal
The circumstances surrounding Donaghy's death were among the most hotly contested following Bloody Sunday. The British Army and the Royal Ulster Constabulary stated that nail bombs had been found inside the pockets of both his denim jacket and jeans after he was shot. The first inquiry into Bloody Sunday, the since discredited Widgery Tribunal, chaired by Lord Widgery, agreed with the military. Donaghy's family and others claim the nail bombs were planted by troops to blacken Donaghy's name and provide an excuse for the killings.

Saville Inquiry
In his closing statement during the Saville Inquiry, Christopher Clarke, QC, counsel to the inquiry, told the tribunal judges that they must decide if Donaghy had had nail bombs in his possession when he was shot dead. Donaghy was photographed at an army post with four nail bombs in his pockets but a number of civilians who tried to take him to hospital told the tribunal he was unarmed. A British soldier who stopped the car containing Donaghy at a checkpoint and subsequently drove him the rest of the way to hospital said he had no bombs; and a British military doctor who examined him stated he saw no bombs either.

After a lengthy examination of the evidence, in the inquiry's report Lord Saville concludes "in our view Gerald Donaghy was probably in possession of the nail bombs when he was shot", but also notes "It remains to say, for reasons given elsewhere in this report, that Gerald Donaghy was not shot because of his possession of nail bombs".

References

1954 births
1972 deaths
Deaths by firearm in Northern Ireland
People of The Troubles (Northern Ireland) from Derry (city)
People killed by security forces during The Troubles (Northern Ireland)